Debbi (born Deborah Kahl; also ; 12 May 1993) is a German-Czech singer of rock and pop music. She was a semi-finalist in the first season of television series Czech and Slovak SuperStar, and won the "Song of the Year" award for her song "Touch the Sun" at the 2010 Anděl Awards. She sings in Czech and English.

Biography

Background
Debbi was born in Germany to a German father and Czech mother, moving to the Czech Republic with her family when she was ten years old. She has a sister who is two years older than her.

Recording career
In 2009, Debbi took part in the Czech and Slovak reality television show SuperStar, where she advanced to the semi-finals of the competition. She subsequently signed a record deal with Sony Music and began working with producer Martin Ledvina on her first single. Her song "Touch the Sun" received national recognition in February 2011, as it was awarded the title of 2010's "Song of the Year" at the Anděl Awards. In April 2011, she released her debut album on Sony Music, Touch the Sun. It went directly to the top of the IFPI album chart in the Czech Republic. The album featured English, as well as Czech lyrics. She toured in 2011, undertaking the "Debbi Metaxa Tour 2011", which included a performance in Zlín.

Her second album, Love, Logic & Will, was released in April 2013. The album, which was recorded in Prague, took almost a year to complete. It featured a duet between Debbi and Czech American singer Ivan Kral. The album peaked at number 10 on the Czech album chart. The first single from the album, "You Take Me There", was released in March of that year.

Discography

Studio albums
 2011: Touch the Sun
 2013: Love, Logic & Will
 2017: Break

Awards and nominations

References

External links
 
 

1993 births
Living people
21st-century Czech women singers
Artists from Dortmund
German emigrants to the Czech Republic
Czech pop singers
Czech rock musicians
Universal Music Group artists